The following is a list of all of the active and decommissioned power stations in Macau, China.

Active power stations

Decommissioned power stations

See also
 Electricity sector in Macau
 CEM (Macau)
 List of power stations

References

 
Energy in Macau
Macau-related lists
Power stations